The Second Tarlev Cabinet was the Cabinet of Moldova from 19 April 2005 to 31 March 2008. It was the second government led by Vasile Tarlev who was the Prime Minister of Moldova from 2001 to 2008.

Cabinet of Ministers 

The composition of the cabinet was as follows:

Prime Minister
Vasile Tarlev (19 April 2005 - 31 March 2008)

First Deputy Prime Minister
Zinaida Greceanîi (10 October 2005 - 31 March 2008)

Deputy Prime Minister
Valerian Cristea (19 April 2005 - 15 November 2006)
Vitalie Vrabie (15 November 2006 - 16 July 2007)
Victor Stepaniuc (16 January - 31 March 2008)

Deputy Prime Minister, Minister of Foreign Affairs and European Integration
Andrei Stratan (19 April 2005 - 31 March 2008)

Deputy Prime Minister, Minister of Economy and Trade
Valeriu Lazăr (19 April 2005 - 18 September 2006)
Igor Dodon (18 September 2006 - 31 March 2008)

Minister of Finance
Zinaida Greceanîi (19 April - 10 October 2005)
Mihail Pop (12 October 2005 - 31 March 2008)

Minister of Industry and Infrastructure
Vladimir Antosii (19 April 2005 - 31 March 2008)

Minister of Agriculture and Food Industry
Anatolie Gorodenco (19 April 2005 - 31 March 2008)

Minister of Transport and Roads
Miron Gagauz (19 April 2005 - 23 January 2007)
Vasile Ursu (23 January 2007 - 31 March 2008)

Minister of Environment and Natural Resources
Constantin Mihăilescu (19 April 2005 - 27 February 2008)
Violeta Ivanov (27 February - 31 March 2008)

Minister of Education and Youth Affairs
Victor Țvircun (19 April 2005 - 31 March 2008)

Minister of Health
Valerian Revenco (19 April - 8 November 2005)
Ion Ababii (8 November 2005 - 31 March 2008)

Minister of Social Protection, Family and Children
Galina Balmoș (22 January 2007 - 31 March 2008)

Ministrer of Culture and Tourism
Artur Cozma (19 April 2005 - 31 March 2008)

Minister of Local Public Administration
Vitalie Vrabie (25 May 2006 - 16 July 2007)
Valentin Guznac (16 July 2007 - 31 March 2008)

Minister of Justice
Victoria Iftodi (19 April 2005 - 20 September 2006)
Vitalie Pîrlog (20 September 2006 - 31 March 2008)

Minister of the Interior
Gheorghe Papuc (19 April 2005 - 31 March 2008)

Minister of Informational Development
Vladimir Molojen (19 April 2005 - 31 March 2008)

Minister of Defence
Valeriu Pleșca (19 April 2005 - 11 June 2007)
Ion Coropcean (11 June - 16 July 2007)
Vitalie Vrabie (16 July 2007 - 31 March 2008)

Minister of Reintegration
Vasile Șova (19 April 2005 - 31 March 2008)

Plus 2 ex officio members:

Governor of Gagauzia
Gheorghe Tabunșcic (19 April 2005 - 16 January 2007)
Mihail Formuzal (16 January 2007 - 31 March 2008)

Head of the Academy of Sciences of Moldova
Gheorghe Duca (19 April 2005 - 31 March 2008)

External links 
 Government of Moldova

 

Moldova cabinets
2005 establishments in Moldova
2008 disestablishments in Moldova
Cabinets established in 2005
Cabinets disestablished in 2008